Liquid Child were a German dance music production duo, comprising Tobias Menguser and Jürgen Herbath.  They had chart success in 1999, when they reached #25 in the UK Singles Chart with "Diving Faces". Their next single release was "Return of Atlantis" (1999) which was remixed by Ferry Corsten.

Discography

Albums
Non Stop Liquid (2000)
25th Floor (2007)

Singles
"Diving Faces" (1998)
"Return of Atlantis" (1999)
"Magic Crystals" (2001)

References

German electronic music groups
German techno music groups
German trance music groups
Electronic music duos